Robert Duke is an American music scholar, currently the Marlene and Morton H. Meyerson Centennial Professor of Music and University Distinguished Teaching Professor at University of Texas at Austin.

References

Year of birth missing (living people)
Living people
University of Texas at Austin faculty
American musicologists
Place of birth missing (living people)